Camusterrach  is a remote hamlet, situated on the west coast of Scotland, on the Applecross peninsula, in Strathcarron, west Ross-shire, Scottish Highlands and is in the Scottish council area of Highland.

References

Populated places in Ross and Cromarty